The 1998 European Karate Championships, the 33rd edition, was held  in Belgrade, Serbia from May 8 to 10, 1998.

Competition

Team

Women's competition

Individual

Team

Medal table

References

External links
 Karate Records - European Championship 1998

1998
International sports competitions hosted by Yugoslavia
European Karate Championships
European championships in 1998
International sports competitions in Belgrade
1990s in Belgrade
Karate competitions in Serbia
May 1998 sports events in Europe